The black-headed rufous warbler (Bathmocercus cerviniventris), also known as the black-capped rufous warbler, is a species of bird in the family Cisticolidae.  It is found in Ivory Coast, Ghana, Guinea, Liberia, and Sierra Leone.  Its natural habitats are subtropical or tropical moist lowland forest, subtropical or tropical swampland, and subtropical or tropical moist montane forest.  It is threatened by habitat loss.

References

 Ryan, Peter. (2006). Family Cisticolidae (Cisticolas and allies). pp. 378–492 in del Hoyo J., Elliott A. & Christie D.A. (2006) Handbook of the Birds of the World. Volume 11. Old World Flycatchers to Old World Warblers Lynx Edicions, Barcelona 
 Nguembock B.; Fjeldsa J.; Tillier A.; Pasquet E. (2007): A phylogeny for the Cisticolidae (Aves: Passeriformes) based on nuclear and mitochondrial DNA sequence data, and a re-interpretation of a unique nest-building specialization. Molecular Phylogenetics and Evolution'' 42: 272–286.

black-headed rufous warbler
Birds of West Africa
black-headed rufous warbler
Taxonomy articles created by Polbot